Staudtia pterocarpa, commonly known as pau-vermelho, is a species of plant in the family Myristicaceae. It has characteristic reddish brown, flaky bark which has been used to treat medical conditions such as bruising. The timber is valuable in construction but the species is threatened by logging. The specific epithet (pterocarpa) is derived from the Ancient Greek words pteron meaning a “wing” or "feather" and karpos meaning "fruit".

References

Myristicaceae
Flora of São Tomé Island
Endemic flora of São Tomé and Príncipe
Vulnerable plants
Taxonomy articles created by Polbot